The Theodore Harrington House is a historic house at 77 Hamilton Street in Southbridge, Massachusetts.

Description and history 
The -story wood-frame house was one of the first houses built when Hamilton Street was laid out. It was built for Theodore Harrington, son of Henry Harrington, founder of Southbridge's Harrington Cutlery Company, a manufacturer of knives used in the manufacture of shoes. Its most notable feature is its ornate architrave and doorway with sidelights and transom window.

The house was listed on the National Register of Historic Places on June 22, 1989.

See also
National Register of Historic Places listings in Southbridge, Massachusetts
National Register of Historic Places listings in Worcester County, Massachusetts

References

Houses completed in 1850
Houses in Southbridge, Massachusetts
National Register of Historic Places in Southbridge, Massachusetts
Houses on the National Register of Historic Places in Worcester County, Massachusetts
Greek Revival houses in Massachusetts